Samran railway station is a railway station located in Sila Subdistrict, Mueang Khon Kaen District, Khon Kaen Province. It is the location of PTT's LPG Khon Kaen Depot.

References 

Railway stations in Thailand
Khon Kaen province